FDI World Dental Federation, often shortened to FDI,  is the largest organization representing the dental profession worldwide. Its mission is to lead the world to optimal oral health by promoting oral health as a fundamental human right and advancing the dental profession worldwide. FDI serves as the most prominent representative body for over one million dentists worldwide, developing health policy and continuing education programs, speaking as a unified voice for dentistry in international advocacy, and supporting member associations in oral health promotion activities worldwide.

FDI was established in Paris in 1900. FDI’s membership includes over 200 national member associations and specialist groups in more than 150 countries.

History and purpose
FDI was founded in Paris in 1900.

A non-governmental organization based in Geneva, Switzerland, FDI is governed by a General Assembly, with policy enacted by its Council and activities implemented through five standing committees comprising 60 volunteers from among its national member associations. Every year, some 300 delegates attend FDI’s World Dental Parliament to debate and define the global future of dentistry,

Michele Aerden became its first female president in 2005.

FDI Annual World Dental Congress
The FDI Annual World Dental Congress (FDI AWDC) is a premier global event that brings together dental professionals, researchers, and industry leaders to review and discuss the latest developments in oral health care and related fields. The Congress is organized by FDI World Dental Federation and provides a scientific programme, a trade exhibition, and an international forum to advance the objectives of FDI.

The Scientific Programme is a key component of the Congress and covers a broad range of topics in dentistry, including oral pathology, dental materials, implantology, and preventive dentistry. The programme features educational sessions, keynote lectures, and research presentations by renowned experts from around the world.

The General Assembly and other business meetings of FDI, also known as the FDI World Dental Parliament, is another important aspect of the Congress. This provides an opportunity for FDI member associations and specialist groups to discuss and vote on important matters related to the dental profession and FDI's objectives.

The World Oral Health Forum is a platform for policymakers, public health experts, and other stakeholders to discuss pressing issues in oral health, such as access to care, prevention, and health promotion.

The FDI World Dental Exhibition is a showcase of the latest dental technologies, products, and services from leading industry players.

Finally, the Social Programme offers attendees opportunities to network and socialize with peers from around the world, strengthening relations between dental organizations and people from different countries.

Although the structure of the Congress may vary depending on local circumstances, these main elements provide a comprehensive platform for advancing oral health care and promoting collaboration and knowledge-sharing among dental professionals worldwide.

Year and venue
 2022 Mumbai (India)
 2021 Sydney (Virtual, Australia)
 2019 San Francisco (United States)
 2018 Buenos Aires (Argentina)
 2017 Madrid (Spain)
 2016 Poznań (Poland)
 2015 Bangkok (Thailand)
 2014 New Delhi (India)
 2013 Istanbul (Turkey)
 2012 Hong Kong (Hong Kong SAR, China)
 2011 Mexico City (Mexico)
 2010 Salvador da Bahia (Brazil)
 2009 Singapore (Singapore)
 2008 Stockholm (Sweden)
 2007 Dubai (United Arab Emirates)
 2006 Shenzhen (China)
 2005 Montreal (Canada)
 2004 New Delhi (India)
 2003 Sydney (Australia)
 2002 Vienna (Austria)
 2001 Kuala Lumpur (Malaysia)
 2000 Paris (France)

World Oral Health Day 
FDI World Dental Federation organizes the annual World Oral Health Day since 2013, observed internationally on 20 March. The day is dedicated to raising global awareness of the issues around oral health and the importance of oral hygiene so that governments, health associations and the general public can work together to achieve healthier mouths and happier lives.

Partnership and projects
FDI is a member of the World Health Profession Alliance WHPA, which also includes the International Council of Nurses (ICN), the World Medical Association (WMA), the International Pharmaceutical Federation (FIP) and the World Confederation for Physical Therapy (WCPT).

See also
 FDI World Dental Federation notation
 International Association of Dental Students

References

Dental organizations
International professional associations
International medical and health organizations
International organisations based in Switzerland
Medical and health foundations
Organisations based in Geneva
1900 establishments in Switzerland